Future of value may refer to:
Future value in economics
Future ethical value, as that of potential persons